Dance to the City Beat is an album by American jazz trombonist Kai Winding featuring performances recorded in late 1958 and early 1959 for the Columbia label. The album features tunes relating to American cities.

Reception

Allmusic awarded the album 3 stars.

Track listing
 "(Sidewalks of) Manhattan" (Richard Rodgers, Lorenz Hart) - 3:06
 "Lower Boneville" (Kai Winding) - 2:48
 "St. Louis Blues" (W. C. Handy) - 3:38
 "Chattanooga Choo Choo" (Harry Warren, Mack Gordon) - 2:52
 "Moon Over Miami" (Joe Burke, Edgar Leslie) - 2:08
 "Shuffle Off to Buffalo" (Warren, Al Dubin) - 2:37
 "(I've Got a Gal in) Kalamazoo" (Warren, Gordon) - 2:54
 "Charleston" (James P. Johnson, Cecil Mack) - 3:09
 "On the Atchison, Topeka and the Santa Fe" (Warren, Johnny Mercer) - 3:03
 "Cha Cha Chicago" (Fred Fisher) - 2:36
 "Mobile" (David Holt, Robert Wells) - 2:58
 "I'm a Ding Dong Daddy from Dumas" (Phil Baxter) - 2:56
Recorded in New York City on November 11, 1958 (tracks 1, 4, 5 & 10), January 5, 1959 (tracks 2, 3, 8 & 9) and January 16, 1959 (tracks 6, 7, 11 & 12).

Personnel
Kai Winding – trombone, arranger
Frank Rehak – trombone
Dick Hixon,  Rod Levitt - bass trombone 
Al Epstein – baritone saxophone (tracks 1, 4, 5 & 10)
Hank Jones – piano
Barry Galbraith  – guitar (tracks 1, 4, 5 & 10)
Joe Benjamin (tracks 2, 3, 8 & 9), Milt Hinton (tracks 1, 4-7 & 10-12) – bass
Osie Johnson (tracks 1, 4-7 & 10-12), Charlie Persip (tracks 2, 3, 8 & 9) – drums
Johnny Pacheco – congas, bongos (tracks 1, 4, 5 & 10)

References

Columbia Records albums
Kai Winding albums
1959 albums